is a Japanese boxing-themed manga series written and illustrated by George Morikawa. It has been serialized by Kodansha in the shōnen manga magazine Weekly Shōnen Magazine since October 1989 and collected into 136 tankōbon volumes as of November 2022. It follows the story of high school student Makunouchi Ippo, as he begins his career in boxing and over time obtains many titles and defeats various opponents.

A 76-episode anime adaptation produced by Madhouse aired on Nippon TV from October 2000 to March 2002. A television film and an original video animation (OVA) were released in 2003. A second series titled : New Challenger aired from January to June 2009. A third series : Rising aired from October 2013 to March 2014.

In North America, the first series, including the television film, was licensed by Geneon in 2003, which released it under the name Fighting Spirit. It was re-licensed by Discotek Media in 2020, including the television film and the OVA.

As of December 2021, the manga had over 100 million copies in circulation, making it one of the best-selling manga series. In 1991,  won the 15th Kodansha Manga Award in the shōnen category.

Plot

Ippo Makunouchi is an extremely shy high school student, unable to make friends due to always being busy helping his mother run their family fishing charter business. Because he kept to himself, a group of bullies led by Umezawa got into the habit of picking on him. After Ippo awoke to the sounds of boxers training, the boxer who saved him, Mamoru Takamura, tried to cheer Ippo up by letting him vent his frustrations on a sandbag. It was then that they had their first glimpse into Ippo's talent for boxing. After that incident, Ippo gave the situation a lot of thought and decided that he would like to begin a career as a professional boxer. When he conveys this message to Mamoru Takamura, he gets verbally reprimanded: Takamura thought Ippo was taking professional boxing too lightly. However, Takamura felt that he couldn't outright refuse Ippo, especially since his feat of punching the sandbag much harder than anybody else in the gym (except for Takamura). Therefore, he challenges Ippo to catch 10 falling leaves from a tree simultaneously after a week of training, fully convinced that Ippo would fail, Takamura jogs away as he continues his roadwork.

However, after a week of tough training, involving nightly hours, Ippo manages the technique in the nick of time. He waits for the jogging Takamura to come by his usual path and surprises him by catching all 10 of the falling leaves and only doing so with his left hand. This impresses Takamura greatly, and he informs Ippo that the action required to catch all 10 leaves is called a boxing jab. Takamura invites Ippo back to the boxing gym for introductions.

When they got back to the gym, the coach, Genji Kamogawa, was not at all impressed by Makunouchi's lack of fighting spirit, and therefore, was challenged by Takamura to have a practice spar against a member of the gym. However, Kamogawa decides to give Ippo a severe challenge and tells him to spar with Miyata, who is 16, the same age as Ippo. Miyata is known as a boxing prodigy and is one of Kamogawa gym's future hopes. Takamura gets extremely worried with this prospect, as Miyata skill is way above the four-rounder pro boxer. As expected, Ippo loses by KO, but not until Miyata struggles dodging his punches and finally ends the match with his trump card: "The Counter". Coach Kamogawa decides that he has great fighting sense and spirit and decides to train him to eventually become the Japanese champion with a world ranking while Miyata became the OPBF (Oriental Pacific Boxing Federation) Champion. Both are expected to hit high in the rankings and, eventually, fight each other for the world champion's belt.

The story focuses heavily on character development—even during the matches something is learned about both fighters. Ippo has a habit of running into his opponents before matches, giving him a chance to learn more about their backgrounds and even sympathize with them. Ippo is an extremely timid and modest person who never assumes that he is strong enough. He instead draws courage from seeing the strength of his opponent and realizing that he is able to stand up to it. Ippo and his friendly rivalry with Miyata is the main draw in the early part of the series. That later changes to Ippo's path toward the Japanese Featherweight Championship and eventually the world championship. Along the way the audience is given glimpses into the other characters' pasts, motivations, relationships to others, and current boxing trials. A colorful cast of supporting characters and opponents as well as side stories concerning their paths in the boxing world rounds out the series.

Media

Manga

 is written and illustrated by George Morikawa. The manga has been published in Kodansha's shōnen manga anthology Weekly Shōnen Magazine since October 11, 1989. It has run in the magazine for over 30 years, and reached its 1000th chapter in December 2012. It became the 9th longest running manga series with over 1400 chapters released in Japan as of 2022. Kodansha has collected its chapters into individual tankōbon volumes. The first volume was published on February 17, 1990. As of November 17, 2022, 136 volumes have been published. In June 2021, it was announced that the series would get a digital release, for the first time in 33 years of publication, starting on July 1 of the same year.

Anime

 has been adapted into an anime series franchise. The first 75-episode anime television series, produced by Madhouse, Nippon Television and VAP and directed by Satoshi Nishimura, aired on Nippon TV between October 4, 2000, and March 27, 2002. The episodes were collected into twenty-five DVDs released by VAP from March 16, 2001 to March 21, 2003. The last DVD includes a special episode which did not air in Japan, numbered 76. A television film titled : Champion Road aired on April 18, 2003. An original video animation (OVA) titled  Mashiba vs. Kimura was released on September 5, 2003.

A second series titled : New Challenger aired on Nippon TV from January 6 to June 30, 2009.

In 2009, Rikiya Koyama, the voice actor of Mamoru Takamura, revealed on his blog that a sequel to the : New Challenger television series was being planned. At the end of his blog entry, he wrote, "Of course, a sequel is also being planned!!". In July 2013, it was reported in that year's 34th issue of Kodansha's Weekly Shōnen Magazine that a third season of  would air in the fall 2013 season. The third season, titled : Rising, ran for 25 episodes from October 5, 2013 to March 29, 2014. : Rising was streamed on Crunchyroll.

In North America, the first series was licensed by Geneon Entertainment in 2003, which released it under the name Fighting Spirit. Geneon distributed Fighting Spirit on 15 DVDs with five episodes per disc. The first DVD was released on July 6, 2004 and the fifteenth released on December 19, 2006. The DVDs included English and Spanish language tracks, as well as the original Japanese. The TV film Champion Road was released on North America on January 9, 2007. There were no plans to release the OVA, Mashiba vs. Kimura. Disc sales of the series did not perform well. In September 2020, Discotek Media announced that they had licensed the series, including the 76 episodes, Champion Road and, for the first time in North America, the OVA Mashiba vs. Kimura. The first Blu-ray Disc set (episodes 1–24) was released on January 26, 2021. The second set (episodes 25–48) was released on March 30, 2021.

Music
The music for the first anime series was composed by Tsuneo Imahori, who also did the third opening theme song. Tracks of guitars, drums, piano, horns, and combinations of the instruments were used to help accentuate the mood and action of the scenes. The soundtrack was released in Japan on two CDs, First KO and Final Round. The music for the second series was composed by Yoshihisa Hirano. In the third series, Yoshihisa Hirano and Tsuneo Imahori are credited for the music.

Anime theme songs
Opening theme songs
"Under Star" by Shocking Lemon (episodes 1–25)
"Inner Light" by Shocking Lemon (episodes 26–50, TV movie)
"Tumbling Dice" by Tsuneo Imahori (episodes 51–76)
"Hekireki" by Last Alliance (episodes 77–102)
"Yakan Hikou" by Wasureranneyo (episodes 103–127)

Ending theme songs
"Yuuzora no Kamihikouki" by Mori Naoya (episodes 1–25, TV movie)
"360°" by Mori Naoya (episodes 26–50, 75, OVA)
"Eternal Loop" by Saber Tiger (episodes 51–74, 76)
"8 AM" by Coldrain (episodes 77–102)
"Buchikome!!" by Shikuramen (episodes 103–127)

Video games
There have been some video games based on the series, first released on the PlayStation, then later the PlayStation 2 and Game Boy Advance, and recently to Wii. Two of the games have been released in North America and in PAL territories. There was some confusion regarding the Western title Victorious Boxers 2: Fighting Spirit before its Western release. This is generally assumed to be the same game as  2: Victorious Road, when actually it is the next title in the series,  - The Fighting! All Stars. The Japanese released Victorious Road is unique amongst the titles as it includes the option to create your own boxer and control his training, diet, weight etc. The second Western title, Fighting Spirit, gives the player a choice of over 70 fighters for VS play. Each title has its own story mode which closely follows that of the manga.

Ippo and Takamura have also appeared in the 2009 crossover video game Sunday vs Magazine: Shūketsu! Chōjō Daikessen as playable characters.

Hajime no Ippo: Victorious Boxers was nominated for The Electric Playgrounds 2001 Blister Awards for "Best Console Fighting Game", and D.I.C.E. Awards for "Best Fighting Game of the Year" nomination but lost all to Dead or Alive 3 for Xbox.

Reception
Hajime no Ippo won the 15th Kodansha Manga Award in the shōnen category in 1991. The series also received a Special Award at the 43rd Kodansha Manga Award, commemorating 110 years since Kodansha's founding in 2019. On TV Asahi's Manga Sōsenkyo 2021 poll, in which 150.000 people voted for their top 100 manga series, Hajime no Ippo ranked 47th.

By September 2008, the Hajime no Ippo manga had over 73 million copies in circulation. By November 2019, it had over 96 million copies in circulation. By December 2021, it had over 100 million copies in circulation.

Anime Academy gave the first anime series a glowing response; all five reviewers rated it above 90%, with one referring to the series as "the cream of the crop" of the sports genre in anime, and another stating that "fighting and character development have never tangoed so well together". Gia Manry of Fanboy.com listed the series as one of their "Top Ten Underrated Manga". IGN listed : Rising among the best anime series of the 2010s.

See also

References

External links
  
  
  
  
  
 Hajime no Ippo anime official website at VAP 
  
  
 

Hajime no Ippo
1989 manga
2000 anime television series debuts
2003 anime films
2009 anime television series debuts
2013 anime television series debuts
Action anime and manga
Anime series based on manga
Boxing in anime and manga
Comedy anime and manga
Discotek Media
Geneon USA
Kodansha manga
Madhouse (company)
Manga adapted into films
MAPPA
Nippon TV original programming
Shōnen manga
Winner of Kodansha Manga Award (Shōnen)